Shunfengshan Park, located at the foot of Taiping Mountain in Shunde District, Foshan City, is one of the "Ten Attractions of Shunde". It was built between 1999 and 2002, and was opened to public on October 24, 2004.

Notable places 
The paifang inside is the symbol of the park. It's called China's No.1 Paifang because of its massive size. The paifang is 37.6 meters high and 88 meters wide, decorated with engravings of dragons, lions, birds and gods.

References 

Buildings and structures in Foshan
Tourist attractions in Guangdong
Shunde District
Parks in Guangdong